
Year 357 (CCCLVII) was a common year starting on Wednesday (link will display the full calendar) of the Julian calendar. At the time, it was known as the Year of the Consulship of Constantius and Iulianus (or, less frequently, year 1110 Ab urbe condita). The denomination 357 for this year has been used since the early medieval period, when the Anno Domini calendar era became the prevalent method in Europe for naming years.

Events 
 By place 
 Roman Empire 
 April 28 – Emperor Constantius II enters Rome for the first time to celebrate his victory over Magnentius. He address the Senate and the Roman people.
 August 25 – Battle of Strasbourg: Julian, Caesar (deputy emperor) and supreme commander of the Roman army in Gaul, wins an important victory against the Alemanni at Strasbourg (Argentoratum), driving the barbarians back behind the Rhine.
 The Imperial Library of Constantinople is founded.
 Ammianus Marcellinus describes the Pantheon as being "rounded like the boundary of the horizon and vaulted with a beautiful loftiness".
 Winter – Constantius II receives ambassadors from the Persian Empire. They demand that Rome restore the lands surrendered by King Narseh.

 Asia 
 The reign of Fú Jiān, the emperor of Former Qin, commences in China. 
 The Alans rout the Hun army in Western Asia.

 Ireland 
 Saran, King of Ulster, is overthrown.

 By topic 
 Religion 
 Late in the year Pope Liberius travels to Sirmium (Pannonia) and agrees to sign documents that effectively undo the Nicene Creed (which has implicitly disavowed Arianism) and to sever his relationship with the former Alexandrian patriarch Athanasius, who is replaced as bishop of Alexandria by his Arian opponent George of Cappadocia.
 At about this date, the relics of St Andrew the Apostle are taken from Patras to Constantinople by order of the Emperor Constantius II, and deposited in the Church of the Holy Apostles. 
 At about this date, Basil of Caesarea visits Egypt.

Births

Deaths 
 Fu Sheng, Chinese emperor of the Di state Former Qin (b. 335)
 Xie Shang (or Renzu), Chinese general and musician (b. 308)
 yao Xiang (or Jingguo), Chinese general and warlord (b. 331)

References